The Longest Yard is a 2005 American sports comedy film directed by Peter Segal and written by Sheldon Turner. A remake of 1974's The Longest Yard, it stars Adam Sandler as a washed-up former professional quarterback who, in exchange for reduced prison sentence, is forced to assemble a football team to play against the guards. The film co-stars Chris Rock, James Cromwell, Nelly, William Fichtner and Burt Reynolds, who played Sandler's role in the original.

It was released by Paramount Pictures in the United States and Sony Pictures Releasing–under the Columbia Pictures label–in other territories on May 27, 2005.

Plot 
Paul Crewe is a former NFL quarterback who was accused of shaving points. Though it was never confirmed, he was placed on federal probation for five years. One night, he gets drunk during a party and goes joyriding through San Diego in the Bentley of his girlfriend Lena, causing a high-speed police chase and car crash. His probation is revoked and he is sentenced to three years in prison. 
	
Using his influence and contacts, Allenville Penitantary Warden Rudolph Hazen, an avid football fan, manages to have Crewe transferred into his prison. He wants to use Crewe as a coach for his personal football team composed of his prison guards to boost his reputation for future elections as State Governor. Using a week in a hot box to coerce him, Crewe recommends that the guards, led by head guard Captain Knauer, play a tune-up game, a game between the guards and a team that they easily slaughter to boost morale. Hazen tasks Crewe with forming a team composed of the prison inmates, believing that he will be unable to unite the unruly prisoners, thus not only achieving his goals, but also exerting his power over the inmates.

Crewe befriends inmate Caretaker, who helps organize tryouts but finds a mostly inept roster due to Crewe's legacy. Seeing the team forming attracts former college football star Nate Scarborough, who offers to help coach the team by gathering several inmates with violent reputations, most of whom join in order to exact revenge against the abusive guards. Caretaker implores Crewe to seek out assistance from the black inmates to gain some much needed offensive strength and speed. Crewe challenges their leader, Deacon Moss, to a one-on-one basketball game but refuses to call any fouls on Deacon, despite them being blatant. Deacon wins and refuses to offer help, but Earl Megget is impressed by Crewe's resilience and joins as his running back.

As the team gains strength, Hazen and the guards hinder Crewe's team in several ways, such as taunting Megget into attacking a guard by verbally harassing him at the library with ethnic slurs; Megget, however, does not retaliate. Deacon and the other black inmates witness this and decide to join Crewe's team to exact revenge. Meanwhile, inmate Unger spies on the activities of the inmates for the guards and is implored to use his "talents" to weaken their team. Unger rigs an incendiary explosive into the radio in Crewe's cell, which Caretaker accidentally sets off and is sealed within Crewe's cell by Unger, preventing anyone from rescuing him.

On game day, the inmates are revitalized in the wake of Caretaker's murder when they find he used his connections to his cousin at Reebok to supply the inmates with quality uniforms and gear as well as giving them the team name Mean Machine. Crewe deals with some difficulty getting the inmates to focus on winning the game during opening play, stating that a loss to them would be a far bigger mark of shame to the guards than any physical brutality they could inflict on them. Though the guards take an early lead, even having the referees call bogus penalties on them (which Crewe quickly amends by firing the football into the referee's crotch), by the end of the first half, the Mean Machines tie the game.

Hazen corners Crewe during halftime, during which he reveals that Unger killed Caretaker and allegedly says that Crewe was his accomplice, along with Knauer allegedly witnessing the plan to kill Caretaker. Crewe initially dismisses the allegations, but Hazen threatens to increase his prison sentence to 25 years unless Crewe purposely throws the game and gives the guards a two-touchdown lead. Reluctantly, Crewe agrees. Hazen then orders Knauer to "inflict as much damage as possible" on the inmates once they get the lead. During the opening of the second half, Crewe deliberately throws the game and abandons his teammates despite their efforts to catch up in scoring. After earning a two touchdown lead on the Mean Machines, the Guards begin to brutally injure the inmates, spurring Crewe to re-enter the field. The inmates initially refuse to help him, allowing him to be sacked twice, but on 4th down and long, Crewe completes a 1st down on his own. Crewe confesses that he had threw the game that got him cut from the NFL, citing he owed debts to “worse people”. Informing the team of Hazen's threats, he declares that he would rather stay with the inmates than betray Caretaker's memory. The Mean Machines rally behind Crewe once more and with a decisive two-point conversion, they win the game by a one-point margin.

Knauer, having newfound respect for Crewe, congratulates him for the win and informs Crewe that he is aware that he had nothing to do with Caretaker's murder and would defend him. Hazen admonishes Knauer for losing a fixed game and notices that Crewe is heading towards the exit. Eagerly implying Crewe is trying to escape, Hazen orders that Crewe be shot. Knauer hesitates and at the last moment realizes, and scornfully informs Hazen, that Crewe is only picking up the game football. Crewe returns it to Hazen, telling him to "stick it in [his] trophy case". Deacon and Battle then dump Gatorade on Hazen, while Crewe and Scarbrough go to get information on where Unger is so that psychotic inmate Switowski can deal with him.

Cast

Cons

Guards

Other

Production 
The movie was filmed primarily at the New Mexico State Penitentiary on Route 14, Santa Fe, New Mexico. The football game at the end of the movie was filmed at Murdock Stadium at the El Camino College in Torrance, California. The car chase scene was filmed in Long Beach, California. Other parts of the movie were filmed in Los Angeles and New Mexico. The golf course scene was filmed at Lost Canyons Golf Club in Simi Valley, California.

Music 

The official soundtrack, which consisted entirely of hip-hop music, was released on May 24, 2005, by Derrty Ent. Records and Universal Records. It peaked at #11 on the Billboard 200 and #10 on the Top R&B/Hip-Hop Albums.

The film itself contains a mixture of hip-hop and rock music, featuring music by Creedence Clearwater Revival, Norman Greenbaum, and AC/DC, among others.

Release 
It was released on May 27, 2005, in the United States and September 9, 2005, in the United Kingdom. It was released the same day as DreamWorks Animation's family friendly film Madagascar, also starring Chris Rock.

Reception

Box office 
The Longest Yard did well at the box office. Its $47.6 million opening weekend was the largest of Sandler's career and only second to The Day After Tomorrow as the largest opening by a movie that was not #1. The film would go on to gross $158.1 million in the United States and Canada and $190 million worldwide. It was the highest-grossing film produced by MTV Films, until it was surpassed by Hansel and Gretel: Witch Hunters.

Critical response  
The Longest Yard has received mixed reviews. On Rotten Tomatoes, the film has an approval rating of 31% based on 170 reviews, with an average rating of 4.8/10. The website's critical consensus reads, "This Yard has some laughs but missing from this remake is the edginess of the original." On Metacritic, the film has a weighted average score of 48 out of 100, based on 35 critics, indicating "mixed or average reviews". Audiences polled by CinemaScore, gave the film a grade of "A−" on an A+ to F scale.

Roger Ebert, in the critical minority with this title, gave it a "Thumbs Up", defending it later in his Chicago Sun-Times review as a film that "...more or less achieves what most of the people attending it will expect." In the print review, Ebert beseeches his readers to "...seek out a movie you could have an interesting conversation about", citing films not in wide release such as Dominion: Prequel to the Exorcist and Kontroll, until finally encouraging his readers to "drop any thought of seeing anything else instead" if they can see Crash.

Accolades 
The film earned Chris Rock a BET Comedy Award for Outstanding Supporting Actor in a Theatrical Film.

Burt Reynolds earned a nomination at the 26th Golden Raspberry Awards for Worst Supporting Actor for his performance in both this film and The Dukes of Hazzard.

References

External links 

 
 
 The Longest Yard at americanfootballfilms

2005 films
2000s American films
2000s sports comedy films
2000s prison films
2005 comedy films
American sports comedy films
American crime comedy films
Remakes of American films
American football films
American prison comedy films
2000s English-language films
Films set in San Diego
Films set in Texas
Films shot in New Mexico
Pittsburgh Steelers in popular culture
Films scored by Teddy Castellucci
Films directed by Peter Segal
Paramount Pictures films
Columbia Pictures films
MTV Films films
Happy Madison Productions films